Pascagoula Parish was a parish (county) of the Territory of Orleans, formed in 1811 from the formerly Spanish West Florida colony. It was eliminated in 1812, the same year that Louisiana became a U.S. state, when the Gulf of Mexico coastal lands (between the Pearl River and the Perdido River) were transferred to the Mississippi Territory.

Pascagoula Parish was never within Louisiana's state borders as we know them today. It was a U.S. territorial jurisdiction which existed for approximately one year and is located in the area which is today the coastal part of the state of Mississippi.

Former parishes of Louisiana